In topology and related branches of mathematics, separated sets are pairs of subsets of a given topological space that are related to each other in a certain way: roughly speaking, neither overlapping nor touching.  The notion of when two sets are separated or not is important both to the notion of connected spaces (and their connected components) as well as to the separation axioms for topological spaces.

Separated sets should not be confused with separated spaces (defined below), which are somewhat related but different.  Separable spaces are again a completely different topological concept.

Definitions

A most basic way in which two sets can be separated is if they are disjoint, that is, if their intersection is the empty set. This property has nothing to do with topology as such, but only set theory. Each of the properties below is stricter than disjointness, incorporating some topological information. The properties are presented in increasing order of specificity, each being a stronger notion than the preceding one.

Since every set is contained in its closure, two separated sets automatically must be disjoint.

(Sometimes you will see the requirement that  and  be open neighbourhoods, but this makes no difference in the end.) For the example of and  you could take  and  Note that if any two sets are separated by neighbourhoods, then certainly they are separated.

You could make either  or   closed by including the point 1 in it, but you cannot make them both closed while keeping them disjoint. Note that if any two sets are separated by closed neighbourhoods, then certainly they are separated by neighbourhoods.

Note that if any two sets are precisely separated by a function, then they are separated by a function.

Relation to separation axioms and separated spaces

The separation axioms are various conditions that are sometimes imposed upon topological spaces, many of which can be described in terms of the various types of separated sets. As an example we will define the T2 axiom, which is the condition imposed on separated spaces. Specifically, a topological space is separated if, given any two distinct points x and y, the singleton sets {x} and {y} are separated by neighbourhoods.

Separated spaces are usually called Hausdorff spaces or T2 spaces.

Relation to connected spaces

Given a topological space X, it is sometimes useful to consider whether it is possible for a subset A to be separated from its complement. This is certainly true if A is either the empty set or the entire space X, but there may be other possibilities. A topological space X is connected if these are the only two possibilities. Conversely, if a nonempty subset A is separated from its own complement, and if the only subset of A to share this property is the empty set, then A is an open-connected component of X. (In the degenerate case where X is itself the empty set , authorities differ on whether  is connected and whether  is an open-connected component of itself.)

Relation to topologically distinguishable points

Given a topological space X, two points x and y are topologically distinguishable if there exists an open set that one point belongs to but the other point does not. If x and y are topologically distinguishable, then the singleton sets {x} and {y} must be disjoint. On the other hand, if the singletons {x} and {y} are separated, then the points x and y must be topologically distinguishable. Thus for singletons, topological distinguishability is a condition in between disjointness and separatedness.

See also

Citations

Sources

  
  
 

Separation axioms
Topology